Saint Francis Receiving the Stigmata may refer to:

 Saint Francis Receiving the Stigmata (Gentile da Fabriano), c. 1420
 Saint Francis Receiving the Stigmata (Giotto), c. 1295–1300
 Saint Francis Receiving the Stigmata (Rubens), c. 1615–1630
 Saint Francis Receiving the Stigmata (Titian), c. 1525
 Saint Francis Receiving the Stigmata (van Eyck), c. 1428–1432
 Saint Francis Receiving the Stigmata, three works by El Greco, late 1500s